The 1976 Oklahoma Sooners football team represented the University of Oklahoma in the 1976 NCAA Division I football season.  Oklahoma was a member of the Big Eight Conference and played its home games in Oklahoma Memorial Stadium, where it has played its home games since 1923.  The team posted a 9–2–1 overall record and a 5–2–0 conference record to earn a share of the Conference title under head coach Barry Switzer who took the helm in 1973. This was Switzer's fourth conference title in four seasons.

The team was led by two All-Americans: Zac Henderson and Mike Vaughan. After tying with Oklahoma State and Colorado for the conference title, it earned a trip to the Fiesta Bowl where it came out victorious against the Wyoming Cowboys.  During the season, it faced five ranked opponents (In order, #16 Texas, #15 Kansas, #19 Colorado, #11 Missouri and #10 Nebraska).  Four of its opponents finished the season ranked.  It tied with Texas in the Red River Shootout and lost to Oklahoma State and Colorado.  The Sooners started the season with a 5–0–1 record.  They also began and ended the season with four-game winning streaks. Sophomore Daryl Hunt's 177 tackles that season would stand as the school record for five years and continues to be the second highest total behind Jackie Shipp's 189 in 1981.

Kenny King led the team in rushing with 839 yards, Dean Blevins led the team in passing with 384 yards, Steve Rhodes led the team in receiving with 160 yards, Uwe von Schamann and Horace Ivory led the team in scoring with 72 points, Hunt led the team in tackles with a record-setting 177 as well as interceptions with 4.

Schedule

Roster

Game summaries

Vanderbilt

California

Florida State

Source: Eugene Register-Guard

Iowa State

Texas

Kansas

Oklahoma State

Colorado

Kansas State

Missouri

Nebraska

Fiesta Bowl

Rankings

Awards and honors

All-American: Zac Henderson and Mike Vaughan

Postseason

NFL draft
The following players were drafted into the National Football League following the season.

References

External links
1976 season at SoonerStats.com

Oklahoma
Oklahoma Sooners football seasons
Big Eight Conference football champion seasons
Fiesta Bowl champion seasons
Oklahoma Sooners football